Pasáček z doliny (English: The Little Shepherd Boy from the Valley) is a 1984 Czechoslovak film. The film starred Vlastimil Drbal and Josef Kemr. It was based on a novel by Ladislav Fuks.

Cast
Vlastimil Drbal as The Little Shepherd
Josef Kemr as the grandfather
Libuše Geprtová as the mother
Radka Fidlerová as publican's wife
Bronislav Poloczek as Gamekeeper
Jiří Schmitzer as Králík
Vlastimil Zavřel as Lojzek
Jiří Štěpnička as Blondýn
Ilja Prachař as Mayor
Václav Sloup as Publican

Plot
The film is set in 1947 Beskydy. It follows a 10-year-old boy who regularly shepherds cows next to a destroyed German tank. He grandfather usually looks after him because the boy doesn't have a father and mother has to work. One evening, he meets two mysterious persons. He thinks it is a king of slapsticks with his scribe. They are in fact members of Ukrainian Insurgent Army who plan to plunder the village.

Reception
The film has won an award in Bánská Bystrica for artistic execution.

References

External links
 

1984 films
Czechoslovak drama films
1980s Czech-language films
Czech drama films
Films directed by František Vláčil
Ukrainian Insurgent Army
1980s Czech films
Films about Ukrainian anti-Soviet resistance movement